The Buckley F-1 "Witchcraft"  was an all-metal, two-seat monoplane built by the short-lived Buckley Airplane Company.

Design and development
The Buckley F-1 was one of two aircraft types built by the Buckley Aircraft company in Wichita, Kansas at the beginning of the Great Depression. The project was developed with a German engineer, using corrugated aluminum construction with steel tube framing.

The F-1 was an all-metal aircraft with a faired conventional landing gear. The aircraft featured an enclosed cabin and corrugated aluminum construction on the wing and tail surfaces. The aircraft was built without mock-ups or prototypes and was found to have no room for the pilot's feet. The wing spar had to be cut, modified and re-welded to accommodate a pilot.

Specifications (Buckley F-1)

References

External links
Wichita Eagle pictures
Kansas Aviation Museum pictures

1920s United States civil utility aircraft
F-1
Low-wing aircraft
Single-engined tractor aircraft